Vernacular is the common speech variety of a specific population, as opposed to national, liturgical, literary or scientific idiom.

Vernacular may also refer to:

 Vernacular architecture, a category of architecture based on local needs and construction materials, and reflecting local tradition
 Vernacular culture, cultural forms made and organised by ordinary, often indigenous people
 Vernacular dance, dance styles that evolved outside of dance studios
 Vernacular dialect, also called a folk dialect or non-standard dialect
 Vernacular geography, the sense of place that is revealed in ordinary people's language
 Vernacular literature, literature written in the vernacular — the speech of the "common people"